Rubus eriocarpus is a Mesoamerican species of brambles in the rose family. It grows in Central America and in central and southern Mexico, from Panamá to Puebla.

Rubus eriocarpus is a prickly, hairless shrub. Leaves are palmately compound with 3 or 5 leaflets, the undersides appearing whitish because of a coating of wax. Flowers are white. Fruits are cylindrical or spherical.

References

External links
photo of herbarium specimen at Missouri Botanical Garden, collected in Distrito Federal de México in 1972

eriocarpus
Flora of Mexico
Flora of Central America
Plants described in 1853